, also known as Legend of Shutendoji, is a Japanese manga series created by Go Nagai which combines elements from  Japanese folklore with science fiction. An OVA series was released beginning in 1989 and ending in 1991, for a total of 4 episodes.

In 2002, a remake/sequel titled  started being published in the magazine Champion Red, being one of the series that were released in the first issue of the magazine.

Plot
Artist and writer Ryuichiro Shiba and his wife Kyoko are visiting a temple in order to make a promise of marriage to their ancestors. At that moment, however, two oni appear before them and fight to death, one of them carrying a baby on his mouth. After defeating his opponent, the oni gives Ryuichiro and Kyoko the baby and declares he will return for him after 15 years. After said period of time, strange events starts happening around the baby, now a teenager named Jiro Shutendo.

Characters

Main characters

The fifteen-year-old protagonist of the story, he is an oni.

Jiro's schoolmate and love interest.

Jiro's adoptive human father.

Jiro's adoptive human mother.

One of the two oni created to protect Jiro. He looks relatively humanoid, unlike most oni, and acts as a mentor for Jiro.

One of the two oni created to protect Jiro. He brought him as a baby to his parents.

Allies

Miyuki's older brother and Jiro's first and best friend.

A friend of Yusuke who is a descendant of ancient oni. He's the heir of a yakuza family trained through generations to protect Jiro.

A human descendant of ancient oni and another friend to Yusuke. She is a strong female oni who hides under the guise of a rowdy, masculine-looking girl with a love for professional wrestling. Her nickname is "Ricki".

Another descendant of an oni, a timid, bookish boy with psychic abilities.

Another descendant of an oni and the last member of Yusuke's gang. He is a plump boy with superhuman strength that practises sumo wrestling. He's nicknamed "Koyatashi".

Enemies

The high priest of Ankoku Jashin Kyo ("School of the Evil God from Darkness"), an evil cult who worships demons. His goal is killing Jiro.

Majari's lieutenant, a powerful priest who wields a double kusarigama.

Kukai's son, who grew and became a military cyborg in order to avenge his father.

Original manga publication

Prototype
While this manga has some similarities, it is a completely different story, as well as being a Shōjo manga instead of Shōnen. It would later be renamed as Jashin Senki (邪神戦記) or Princess Han Shutendoji (プリンセス版手天童子).

Original serialization

The manga was originally compiled in 9 volumes, and would later be re-published several times.

Kodansha (KC Magazine, 1977–1978)

Kodansha (KC Special, 1985)

Kodansha (Goka Aizoban, 1988–1989)

Fusosha (Fusosha Bunko, 1996–1997)

Fusosha (Legend of Shutendoji, 1998)

Kodansha (Kodansha Manga Bunko, 2001)

Besides the printed volumes, the manga has also been published in 10 ebook format volumes by ebookjapan. The series has also been published in some compilations of other Nagai's manga.

Publications outside Japan
d/visual published the full series in Italy from 2004 to 2005.

Novels
Two series of novels based on the manga were released during the 1980s. The first one was written by Yasutaka Nagai and was released in 6 volumes from 1986 to 1989 by Kadokawa Shoten.

Kadokawa Shoten (Kadokawa Novels)

The second one was written by Fusamichi Kitamura and published in two volumes published in 1987 by JICC under the label Adventure Novels.

JICC (Adventure Novels)

OVAs
The manga was adapted into 4 OVAs released from 1989 to 1991. The OVAs were originally released on VHS and later on laserdisc, both times by Nippon Columbia.

They were re-released in DVD format also by Columbia in 2001.

Releases outside Japan
The OVAs were released in the US by ADV Films in VHS (4 tapes) and later on DVD (2 discs).

They were also released in Italy by Dynamic on VHS and in Latin America on TV by Locomotion.

Staff and production notes
Distributor: Nippon Columbia
Original work / organization: Go Nagai
Planning work: Dynamic Planning
Director: Junji Nishimura (1, 2), Jun Kawagoe (3), Masatomo Sudo (4)
Scenario: Masashi Sogo
Work supervision: Hideyuki Motohashi (1, 2)
Animation supervisor: Satoshi Hirayama (3, 4), Masatomo Sudo (4)
Character design: Satoshi Hirayama (3, 4)
Mecha design: Masahiko Okura (3, 4)
Art director: Masazumi Matsumiya (1, 2), Masuo Nakayama (3, 4)
Director of photography: Tadashi Hosono (1, 2, 3), Akihiko Takahashi (4)
Sound director: Akira Yamazaki
Music: Fumitaka Anzai
Animation work: Studio Signal
Production: Nippon Animation
Cast: Ryo Horikawa (Jiro Shutendo), Sumi Shimamoto (Miyuki Shiratori), Michihiro Ikemizu (Ryuichiro Shiba), Sanae Takagi (Kyoko Shiba), Rei Sakuma (Tanemura), Hiroya Ishimaru (Kitani), Tessho Genda (Goki), Daisuke Gori (Senki), Osamu Kobayashi (Yonen Majari), Shigeru Sakahara (Yusuke), Yoko Matsuoka (Rickey), Kiyoyuki Yanada (Naojiro), Kiyoshi Kawakubo (Oyama), Akio Otsuka (Iron Kaiser), Rihoko Yoshida (Captain Persis), Ryusei Nakao (Major Gill), Sakiko Tamagawa (Sonia), Chikao Otsuka (Oniryu), Koji Yada (Ishi)
Source(s)

Video game

Gomaden Shutendoji

While it has a similar setting, the story is different from the original series.

References

External links
Shutendouji  at The World of Go Nagai webpage.

1976 manga
1986 Japanese novels
1987 Japanese novels
1989 anime OVAs
2002 manga
Akita Shoten manga
Fusosha Publishing manga
Go Nagai
Kodansha manga
Shōnen manga